Museum de Oude Wolden, abbreviated as MOW, is a regional museum in the village of Bellingwolde in the Netherlands. The museum focuses on art and history of the regions of Oldambt and Westerwolde in the east of the province of Groningen.

The museum opened on 10 August 1973. In the first decades, it primarily exhibited historical objects documenting everyday life. In the late 1990s, the museum started to exhibit artworks of artist collective De Ploeg and magic realist painter Lodewijk Bruckman. Since 2012, it has a permanent display of paintings by Bruckman and temporary exhibitions.

The museum is an independent foundation that is mainly funded by the municipality of Bellingwedde. It is one of the lesser-visited museums in Groningen.

Location
Museum de Oude Wolden is located at the Hoofdweg in the village Bellingwolde in the municipality Bellingwedde in the east of the province Groningen near the Dutch–German border. It is situated in the south of the region Oldambt and in the north of the region Westerwolde.

The old museum building is the restored backhouse of a former mansion of which the fronthouse was destroyed during a World War II bombing. In 2012, the building was renovated and received a new glass entrance, which cost  in total.

History
Streekmuseum de Oude Wolden (Regional Museum the Old Wolds) was opened on 10 August 1973 by the mayor of Bellingwedde Jurjen Jan Hoeksema. In the late 1960s, the province of Groningen requested the national government for subsidy to open a new museum in Bellingwolde. The subsidy was not granted, but the state paid indirectly for the restoration of the museum building via a subsidized employment project.

In 1976, the museum exhibited primarily historical objects from the regions of Oldambt and Westerwolde, such as agricultural machines, traditional costumes, and archaeological and geological finds. After the expansion in 1977, the museum had enough space to hold temporary exhibitions, group the historical objects thematically, and display a 19th-century grocery store inventory. By the late 1980s, a barber shop and shoemaker's inventory were shown in the museum. In 1988, the newspaper Nieuwsblad van het Noorden called the museum "charming" and wrote: "A museum like De Oude Wolden is meaningful because of its rather complete documentation of everyday life in the 19th and early 20th century."

In 1998, the museum started to exhibit paintings by artists of De Ploeg, an artist collective established in the city Groningen. In 1999, the museum also exhibited paintings by Lodewijk Bruckman, who lived in Bellingwedde for some years. At the time, the press described De Oude Wolden as a museum with historical artefacts and artworks by De Ploeg and Bruckman. In 2003, De Ploeg celebrated their 85th birthday with an exhibition in the museum.

The museum dropped the word streek (regional) from its name and now calls itself Museum de Oude Wolden (Museum the Old Wolds). Since the renovation in 2012, the historical objects and the artworks by De Ploeg are no longer on permanent display, the museum now focuses on art, region, and history with Bruckman's paintings and temporary exhibitions. In 2017, the museum became an independent foundation, although the municipality of Bellingwedde still owns the building and the collection.

Exhibitions

Lodewijk Bruckman
The museum has a permanent exhibition of paintings by Lodewijk Bruckman (1903–1995). Bruckman lived in Bellingwolde in a hotel opposite to the museum from 1987 to 1989. He donated 21 paintings to the Bellingwedde municipality in 1988. These paintings, which are now exhibited in the museum, are mostly still lifes in a style which is described as realistic, surrealistic, or magic realistic.

Temporary exhibitions
The museum has two concurrent temporary exhibitions: a larger exhibition spanning several months and a smaller monthly exhibition that features a regional artist. The smaller exhibitions are called 24K, which refers to an area around the museum with a radius of  where the artists are from and the supposed  quality of the artworks.

The larger temporary exhibitions since the renovation in 2012 include:
Typisch Hollands! (2012; Typically Dutch!) with works of nineteen Dutch artists
Het einde, een nieuw begin (2012–2013; The end, a new beginning) with works by De Ploeg
Weer terug in Groningen (2013; Back again in Groningen) with works by Chinese artist Zhuang Hong Yi
Vooruitgangsvisioenen (2013; Visions of progress) about the history of canalization in Westerwolde
24K XL (2014) with works of 27 regional artists from previous 24K exhibitions
Net echt (2014; Like real) with more than 40 works by Lodewijk Bruckman
Voor de draad ermee (2014–2015; Coming clean) about quilting and textile art
Want reizen is ook verdwalen (2015; Because travelling is also getting lost) with works by Dutch artist Yvonne Struys
Streekgenoten (2015; Fellow regionmen) with photography of the region Westerwolde
Onder Vuur (2015–2016; Under Fire) about the First Münster War of 1665–1666
24K XL (2016) with works of 20 regional artists from previous 24K exhibitions
100% Maya (2016) with works by Dutch artist Maya Wildevuur
Duizend Dingen (2016–2017; Thousand Things) with various objects and art works from the museum collection
Trillingen (2017; Vibrations) with works by 24 artists of the collective VanTyNaarLo
Uit Siberië (2017; From Siberia) with works by artists from Tyumen, Siberia
Verknipt (2017–2018; Cut up) with works by quilting collective De Duikvlucht

Administration

The museum is a foundation. It has board of three members, a small paid staff, and around 20 volunteers.
Peter Yspeert has been the foundation chairman since 2017. Obby Veenstra has been the museum director since 2010. In 2010, the municipality of Bellingwedde has guaranteed to fund 95% of the museum's budget for the next fifteen years. The rest of the budget comes from other subsidies and (ticket) sales.

In 2008, the annual total of  included around  visitors. In 2014, a municipal council member claimed the amount of paying visitors was 50% in 2011, 35% in 2012, and 32% in 2013, and director Veenstra claimed it has been around 40% for years.

In 2012, when the museum was closed for renovation from January to early July, it had . Although it is the most-visited museum in the eastern part of the province of Groningen, it is one of the lesser-visited museums in the entire province.

De Oude Wolden is a member of Museumhuis Groningen (Groningen Museum House), which is an umbrella organization for museums and heritage institutions in the province of Groningen. From 2004 to 2009, the museum was registered in the Museumregister Nederland (Netherlands Museum Register), a quality mark for museums in the Netherlands, but the registration was not renewed for several years. The museum has again been registered since 2016.

References

External links

  (in Dutch), official website
 Lodewijk Bruckman (in Dutch), museum website about the painter

Museum de Oude Wolden
Art museums and galleries in the Netherlands
Museum de Oude Wolden
History museums in the Netherlands
Local museums in the Netherlands
Museums in Groningen (province)
Museums established in 1973
20th-century architecture in the Netherlands